Ulavuthurai is a 1998 Tamil-language action crime film directed by Ramesh Selvan. The film stars Vijayakanth, Meena and Sanghavi, with Radha Ravi, Janagaraj, Carlos, Jassi Singh, and Hemanth Ravan, among others, play supporting roles. It was released on 14 January 1998. The film was Vijayakanth's 125th film.

Plot
Several people die mysteriously in the sea, so the navy looks for its best officer Vasanth Periyasamy (Vijayakanth) to investigate the case. Vasanth Periyasamy changes his identity into Krishnamoorthy. He is now a car driver and lives in disguise for his family's sake. In the past, he was married to the illiterate Meena (Meena) and has a daughter named Priya (Baby Jennifer). One day, a terrorist (Hemanth Ravan) kidnapped Meena and threatened to kill her if Vasanth Periyasamy does not release his partners in jail. Meena was then killed in the rescue mission, and the terrorists were released because of corrupt naval officers. The Department of the Navy then sent Vasanth to jail, so Vasanth Periyasamy decides to forget the navy and becomes a simple car driver in disguise. The navy then finds Vasanth Periyasamy and compels him to join them. He finally accepts to solve this odd affair and investigate the sea murders.

Cast

Vijayakanth as Commodore Vasanth Periyasamy  (Krishnamoorthy)
Meena as Meena
Sanghavi as Sangeetha
Radha Ravi as Home Minister Jaidev
Janagaraj as Duraisamy
Hemanth Ravan as Terrorist
Carlos as Terrorist
Jassi Singh as Terrorist
Chitti as Terrorist
Sumithra as Vasanth Periyasamy's mother
Baby Jennifer as Priya, Vasanth's daughter
Charuhasan as Sangeetha's grandfather
Fathima Babu as Sangeetha's mother
Mohan Raman as Venkatraman
Ajay Rathnam as Ajay
Balu Anand as Neurotic
Sethu Vinayagam as Krishnamoorthy's boss
Pasi Narayanan
P. C. Ramakrishna
Prathapachandran
Laxmi Rattan as Sharma
Vincent Roy as Police inspector
Kallukkul Eeram Ramanathan as Marimuthu
K. Rajan (producer) as Rajaram
Rajan

Soundtrack

The film score and the soundtrack were composed by Shah. The soundtrack, released in 1998, features 6 tracks with lyrics written by Vairamuthu.

References

1998 films
1990s Tamil-language films
Films set on ships
Indian Navy in films
Underwater action films
Indian action films
Films about terrorism in India
Films directed by Ramesh Selvan
1998 action films